The brief Alexandrian Crusade, also called the sack of Alexandria, occurred in October 1365 and was led by Peter I of Cyprus against Alexandria in Egypt. Although often referred to as and counted among the Crusades, it was relatively devoid of religious impetus and differs from the more prominent Crusades in that it seems to have been motivated largely by economic interests and was not called or endorsed by the Pope.

History

Peter I spent three years, from 1362 to 1365, amassing an army and seeking financial support for a Crusade from the wealthiest courts of the day. When he learned of a planned Egyptian attack against his Kingdom of Cyprus, he employed the same strategy of preemptive war that had been so successful against the Turks and redirected his military ambitions against Egypt. From Venice, he arranged for his naval fleet and ground forces to assemble at the Crusader stronghold of Rhodes, where they were joined by the Knights of the Order of St. John.

In October 1365, Peter I set sail from Rhodes, himself commanding a sizable expeditionary force and a fleet of 165 ships, despite Venice's greater economic and political clout. Landfall was made in Alexandria around 9 October, and over the next three days, Peter's army pillaged the city killing thousands and taking 5000 people to be enslaved. Mosques, temples, churches and possibly the library also bore the brunt of the raid.

Facing an untenable position, Peter's army permanently withdrew on 12 October. Peter had wanted to stay and hold the city and use it as a beachhead for more crusades into Egypt, but the majority of his barons refused, wishing only to leave with their loot. Peter himself was one of the last to leave the city, only getting onto his ship when Mamluk soldiers entered the city. Monarchs and barons in Europe, struck by the abandonment of the city, referred to Peter as the only good and brave Christian to have crusaded in Alexandria.

The attack is mentioned in line 51 of the Prologue to the Canterbury Tales, noting that the Knight participated.

Interpretations
Jo van Steenbergen, citing Peter Edbury, argues that the crusade was primarily an economic quest. Peter wanted to end the primacy of Alexandria as a port in the Eastern Mediterranean in the hope that Famagusta would then benefit from the redirected trade. Religious concerns, then, were secondary.

Van Steenbergen's description of contemporary Muslim accounts, such as those of al-Nuwayrī al-Iskandarānī and Alī al-Maqrīzī, indicates that the crusading force succeeded partially thanks to superior diversionary tactics. The Alexandrian defensive force occupied itself fighting in the area around the western harbor, while the "real" force, including cavalry, made landfall elsewhere in the city, apparently hiding in a graveyard, undetected by the defenders. The crusading force was thus able to attack from both the front and the rear, panicking the Alexandrians, who did not recover from this setback.

Notes and references

External links
History Avenue: Sack of Alexandria, 1365

 
Conflicts in 1365
Military history of Alexandria
Wars involving the Kingdom of Cyprus
Wars involving the Mamluk Sultanate
1365
14th century in the Mamluk Sultanate
Medieval Alexandria
Looting